The Law of Maximum also known as Law of the Maximum is a principle developed by Arthur Wallace which states that total growth of a crop or a plant is proportional to about 70 growth factors. Growth will not be greater than the aggregate values of the growth factors. Without the correction of the limiting growth factors, nutrients, waters and other inputs are not fully or judicially used resulting in wasted resources.

Applications 

The factors range from 0 for no growth to 1 for maximum growth. Actual growth is calculated by the total multiplication of each growth factor. For example, if ten factors had a value of 0.5, the actual growth would be:

 0.5 x 0.5 x 0.5 x 0.5 x 0.5 x 0.5 x 0.5 x 0.5 x 0.5 x 0.5 = 0.001, which is 0.1% of optimum.

If each of ten factors had a value of 0.9 the actual growth would be:

 0.9 x 0.9 x 0.9 x 0.9 x 0.9 x 0.9 x 0.9 x 0.9 x 0.9 x 0.9 = 0.349, which is 34.9% of optimum.

Hence the need to achieve maximal value for each factor is critical in order to obtain maximal growth.

Demonstrations of "Law of the Maximum" 

The following demonstrates the Law of the Maximum. For the various crops listed below, one, two or three factors were limiting while all the other factors were 1. When two or three factors were simultaneously limiting, predicted growth of the two or three factors was similar to the actual growth when the two or three factors were limits individually and then multiplied together.

Growth Factors

A. Adequacy of Nutrients

B. Non-nutrient elements and nutrients excesses that cause toxicities (stresses)

C. Interactions of the nutrients

D. Soil Conditioning requirement and physical processes

E. Additional biology

F. Weather factors

G. Management

External links
 Law of the Maximum, in Handbook of soil science by Malcolm E. Sumner

References

Computational biology